Nikolayevka is a rural locality in Brezhnevsky Selsoviet Rural Settlement, Kursky District, Kursk Oblast, Russia. Population:

Geography 
The village is located on the Bolshaya Kuritsa River (a right tributary of the Seym River), 95 km from the Russia–Ukraine border, 19 km north-west of Kursk, 4.5 km from the selsoviet center – Verkhnekasinovo.

 Climate
Nikolayevka has a warm-summer humid continental climate (Dfb in the Köppen climate classification).

Transport 
Nikolayevka is located 1 km from the federal route  Crimea Highway (a part of the European route ), on the road of intermunicipal significance  ("Crimea Highway" – Dronyayevo), 17 km from the nearest railway halt Bukreyevka (railway line Oryol – Kursk).

The rural locality is situated 22 km from Kursk Vostochny Airport, 140 km from Belgorod International Airport and 221 km from Voronezh Peter the Great Airport.

References

Notes

Sources

Rural localities in Kursky District, Kursk Oblast